Rottweiler is a breed of dog.

Rottweiler can also refer to:

Rottweiler (film), a 2004 Spanish horror film
an alternate title for Dogs of Hell (sometimes called Rottweiler: Dogs of Hell), a 1982 American horror film
The Rottweiler, a novel about a serial killer
The Rottweilers, a professional wrestling stable
an inhabitant of Rottweil, Germany